Occupy Rochester NY was a collaboration that has included an Occupy movement encampment in Washington Square Park in Rochester, New York. The occupiers were initially given citations and arrested for violating park regulations. On November 10, 2011, however, they reached agreement with the city to camp in the south half of the park until mid January 2012. The agreement was due to the work between Ryan Acuff, and John Smigle. Note that there is also a separate Occupy Rochester MN.

As of June 2012, Occupy Rochester (NY) had continued to engage in organized meetings, events and actions.

Local causes
In addition to the encampment, they have been active in other local causes. These include:
 Helping a family, Harold and Maria Steidel, get a moratorium on their home foreclosure.
 Protesting the closing of a local school, school #6.

See also

Occupy articles
 List of global Occupy protest locations
 Occupy movement
 Timeline of Occupy Wall Street
 We are the 99%

Other Protests
 15 October 2011 global protests
 2011 United States public employee protests
 2011 Wisconsin protests

Related articles
 Arab Spring
 Corruption Perceptions Index
 Economic inequality
 Grassroots movement
 Income inequality in the United States

 Plutocracy
 Protest
 Tea Party protests
 Wealth inequality in the United States

References

Additional sources

External links
 Official website

Occupy movement in the United States
History of Rochester, New York